The Case of the Missing Man is a 1935 American mystery crime film directed by D. Ross Lederman and starring Roger Pryor, Joan Perry and Thurston Hall.

Synopsis
A newspaper photographer is persuaded by his girlfriend to quit his job and set up his own photographic studio. However, when business proves to be slack he becomes a roving cameraman, taking pictures of passers-by in the streets. Things take a dangerous turn when he takes a snap of a violent criminal emerging from a bank robbery.

Cast
 Roger Pryor as Jimmy Hudson
 Joan Perry as Peggy Roberts
 Thurston Hall as Boyle
 Arthur Hohl as Steve
 George McKay as Frank Nelson
 Tom Dugan as Jack Clark
 James Burke as Police Sergeant Rorty
 Arthur Rankin as Hank

References

Bibliography
 Dick, Bernard F. Columbia Pictures: Portrait of a Studio. University Press of Kentucky, 2015.

External links
 

1935 films
1935 crime films
American crime films
1930s English-language films
American black-and-white films
Films directed by D. Ross Lederman
Columbia Pictures films
1930s American films